General elections were held in Republika Srpska on 5 October 2002, as part of the general elections across Bosnia and Herzegovina. Dragan Čavić of the Serb Democratic Party was elected president.

Results

President

National Assembly

References

Elections in Republika Srpska
Republika Srpska
2002 in Bosnia and Herzegovina
October 2000 events in Europe
Election and referendum articles with incomplete results